The 2010 Miami Hurricanes football team represented the University of Miami during the 2010 NCAA Division I FBS football season. The Hurricanes were coached by Randy Shannon during the regular season, then coached by Jeff Stoutland (interim) during their bowl game and played their home games at Sun Life Stadium. They are members of the Coastal Division of the Atlantic Coast Conference. They finished the season 7–6, 5–3 in ACC play and were invited to the Sun Bowl where they were defeated by Notre Dame, 33–17.

Schedule

Pre-season
Following Miami's loss to Wisconsin in the Champs Sports Bowl, defensive lineman Allen Bailey, wide receiver Leonard Hankerson, and offensive lineman Orlando Franklin announced they would be returning for their senior seasons despite being considered possible candidates to enter the 2010 NFL Draft.

In January it was reported that defensive line coach and recruiting coordinator Clint Hurtt would be leaving to go to the University of Louisville to become their new defensive line coach. On January 27, Miami hired Rick Petri to replace Hurtt as the defensive line coach. Petri had previously coached at the University of Kentucky and had once coached the defensive line before at Miami between 1993 and 1995. Wide receivers coach Aubrey Hill was named the new recruiting coordinator. In February, running backs coach Tommie Robinson left to take the same position for the Arizona Cardinals. He was replaced by Mike Cassano, who was previously running backs coach and recruiting coordinator at Florida International University, and had also coached at the University of Massachusetts Amherst under current Miami offensive coordinator Mark Whipple. Head coach Randy Shannon later announced that defensive assistant Michael Barrow would be returning to his position of full-time linebackers coach after defensive coordinator John Lovett had filled the position during the 2009 season. Barrow had been the linebackers coach in 2007 and 2008.

Miami began spring practice on February 23. Quarterback Jacory Harris only participated in non-throwing drills while recovering from a shoulder injury. Miami concluded spring practice with its spring game on March 27.

In March 2010, the Miami track team signed Latwan Anderson, who was also a four-star defensive back recruit in football. Anderson will walk on to the football team in the fall. Anderson's track scholarship will convert to a football scholarship once he plays in his first football game.

On May 12, Randy Shannon signed a new four-year contract with Miami.

On July 9, The New York Times reported that offensive lineman Seantrel Henderson, one of the top high school recruits in the nation, would attend the University of Miami in August 2010, academically cleared to play the 2010 season. Henderson previously signed a national letter of intent to join the USC Trojans. Henderson signed with the Trojans after assurances from coach Lane Kiffin that the Trojans football program would not be hit with major penalties following infractions made in previous seasons. After the NCAA penalized the Trojans in June 2010, Henderson was released from his letter of intent, allowing him to freely sign with another football program.

Senior defensive end Stephen Wesley was dismissed from the team at the end of July, reportedly for academic reasons. On August 2, junior wide receiver Thearon Collier was also dismissed due to team violations.

Miami began fall practice on August 5.

2010 recruiting class

Roster

Depth chart
(prior to Game 12 versus South Florida)

Rankings

Regular season

Florida A&M

1st Quarter
Leonard Hankerson 19 yard touchdown pass from Jacory Harris. Bosher PAT Good. (7-0 MIA)
Leonard Hankerson 40 yard touchdown pass from Jacory Harris. Bosher PAT Good. (14-0 MIA)
2nd Quarter
Damien Berry 32 yard touchdown pass from Jacory Harris. Bosher PAT Good. (21-0 MIA)
Ray Ray Armstrong 22 yard interception return. Bosher PAT Good. (28-0 MIA)
Mike James 1 yard touchdown run. Bosher PAT Good. (35-0 MIA)
3rd Quarter
Lamar Miller 5 yard touchdown run. Bosher PAT Good. (42-0 MIA)
4th Quarter
Matt Bosher 24 yard field goal. (45-0 MIA)

Ohio State

Miami and Ohio State last played when they met in the 2003 Fiesta Bowl playing for the national championship, a game won by Ohio State in double overtime, 31–24. In 2010, Miami lost to Ohio State 36–24, but the Buckeyes' win was later vacated after an NCAA investigation of their program.

Pittsburgh

Miami and Pittsburgh last met in 2003 at Pittsburgh in a game won by Miami 28–14. Miami is 21–9–1 all time against Pittsburgh.

Clemson

Miami and Clemson last met in 2009 at Miami in a game won by Clemson 40–37. Miami is 5–3 all time against Clemson.

Florida State

Jermaine Thomas scored a career-high three touchdowns, all in the first 21 minutes, and Chris Thompson ended the scoring with a 90-yard touchdown run in the 4th quarter. The 90-yard run is the longest run Miami has ever allowed in the history of its football program. The 23rd ranked Seminoles enjoyed a surprisingly easy 45-17 victory. The 45 points is the second-most points Florida State has scored in the series.

Duke

Miami and Duke last met in 2009 at Miami in a game won by Miami 34–16. Miami is 6–1 all time against Duke.

North Carolina

Miami and North Carolina last met in 2009 at Chapel Hill in a game won by North Carolina 33–24. Miami is 5–8 all time against North Carolina.

Virginia

Miami and Virginia last met in 2009 at Miami in a game won by Miami 52–17. Miami is 5–3 all time against Virginia.

Maryland

Miami and Maryland last met in 2006 at College Park in a game won by Maryland 14–13. Miami is 7–8 all time against Maryland.

Georgia Tech

Miami and Georgia Tech last met in 2009 at Miami in a game won by Miami 33–17. Miami is 5–10 all time against Georgia Tech.

Virginia Tech

Miami and Virginia Tech last met in 2009 at Blacksburg in a game won by Virginia Tech 31–7. Miami is 17–10 all time against Virginia Tech.

South Florida

Miami was upset by South Florida losing to the Bulls in over time 23–20. Miami is now 2–1 all time against South Florida.

Sun Bowl: Notre Dame

Shannon fired, Al Golden hired
Head coach Randy Shannon was fired the day following the South Florida loss.

On December 12, 2010, ESPN reported that Miami had offered the new head coaching position to former Temple University head coach Al Golden.

In press-conference remarks upon his hiring on December 13, 2010, Golden emphasized the importance of the Miami legacy.  "It's the most recognizable brand in college football," he said; "I go back to the former players that are here, the five national championships, 20 national award winners, countless All-Americans, incredible tradition; it's a dream job."

Golden also announced after the bowl game that offensive coordinator Mark Whipple would not be retained and his replacement could come from the NFL.

References

Miami
Miami Hurricanes football seasons
Miami Hurricanes football